The Fundació Joan Miró ("Joan Miró Foundation, Centre of Studies of Contemporary Art") is a museum of modern art honoring Joan Miró located on the hill called Montjuïc in Barcelona, Catalonia (Spain).

History
The idea for the foundation was made in 1968 by Joan Miró. Miró formed the foundation with his friend Joan Prats. Miró wanted to create a new building that would encourage particularly younger artists to experiment with contemporary art. The building was designed by Josep Lluís Sert to ensure that this work could also be made available to the public and exhibited. He designed the building with courtyards and terraces and to create a natural path for visitors to move through the building.

Building began on the mountain of Montjuïc and the foundation opened on 10 June 1975. Not only was the architect a close friend of Miró but so was the first president Joaquim Gomis and Miró was amongst the first board. It was claimed that the new foundation represented a new way of viewing the concept of a museum and how the people of Barcelona could relate to their cultural heritage.

Expansion in 1986 to the building added an auditorium and a library which holds some of the 10,000 items in the Foundation and Miró's collection.

Works by Joan Miró
Many of the works in the building were donated by the artist himself. Highlights include:
The wing of the lark ..., 1967
Hermitage of San Juan Huerta, 1917
Street Pedralbes, 1917
Portrait of a boy, 1919
Painting (the white gloves), 1925
Flame in space and Naked woman, 1932
Character, 1934
Man and Woman in Front of a Pile of Excrement, 1935
Naked woman climbing a staircase, 1937
No, 1937
The Morning Star, 1940
Barcelona Series, 1944
The Diamond smiles at twilight, 1947–1948
The Caress of a Bird, 1967
The gold of the azure, 1967
Painting on white to a solitary cell I, II, III, 1968
Figure in front of the sun, 1968
Catalan peasant by moonlight, 1968
Miró's Chicago, 1968
Character, 1970, May 1968, 1968–1973
Tapestry of the Fundació, 1979

Collection
In line with Miró's original idea the Foundation has a space named "" which is dedicated to promoting the work of young experimental artists. Many curators have been in charge of that program, including Frederic Montornes, Monica Regàs, and Ferran Barenblit, who was later Director of MACBA. Although there is also work by Peter Greenaway, Chillida, René Magritte, Rothko, Tàpies and Saura.

The collection includes Alexander Calder's 4 Wings and Mercury Fountain. The Mercury Fountain uses the liquid metal mercury to create a fountain. As mercury is poisonous, the fountain is kept behind glass to protect the visitors.

The museum uses QRpedia to allow visitors to read Wikipedia articles about objects in the collection, translated into their preferred language.

See also
 List of museums in Barcelona
 Joan Miró: The Ladder of Escape
 Fundació Pilar i Joan Miró in Mallorca
 List of single-artist museums

References 

Buildings and structures completed in 1975
Art museums and galleries in Barcelona
Modern art museums in Catalonia
Miro, Joan
Foundations based in Catalonia
Sants-Montjuïc
Modernist architecture in Barcelona
Art museums established in 1975
1975 establishments in Spain
1975 establishments in Catalonia
Miro, Joan
Joan Miró